Lee Bottom Airport  is a privately owned and public use airport  south of Hanover, in Jefferson County, Indiana. The airport was re-opened in April 1991.

See also

References

External links
Lee Bottom Flying Field at YouTube (Journey Indiana interview with owners)

Airports in Indiana
Transportation buildings and structures in Jefferson County, Indiana